Elachista adscitella is a moth of the family Elachistidae found in Europe.

Description
Adults are pale grey with a whitish head and a white transverse line across the center of the forewing. They are on wing from May to July and again in August in two generations per year.

The larvae feed on false-brome (Brachypodium sylvaticum), Carex elata, a bunch grass (Calamagrostis arundinacea), tufted hair-grass (Deschampsia cespitosa), wavy hair-grass (Deschampsia flexuosa), bearded couch (Elymus caninus), Festuca altissima, Festuca drymeja, giant fescue (Festuca gigantea), mountain melick (Melica nutans), wood mellick (Melica uniflora), wood millett (Milium effusum), Phleum species, broad-leaved meadow-grass (Poa chaixii), Poa remota, Sesleria albicans, Sesleria argentea, blue moor-grass (Sesleria caerulea) and Sesleria sadlerana. They mine the leaves of their host plant which consists of a gradually widening corridor. It may run up- or down-wards. The frass is deposited in the first part of the mine. Two to three larvae may occupy a single mine and more than one mine may be found in a single leaf. Larvae can be found from October to the end of May and from mid June to the end of July. Larvae of the first generation hibernate inside the mine.

Distribution
It is found in all of Europe, except Iceland, the Balkan Peninsula, Ukraine and Lithuania.

References

External links
 Plant Parasites of Europe

adscitella
Leaf miners
Moths described in 1851
Moths of Europe
Taxa named by Henry Tibbats Stainton